Nathan A. Perrott (born December 8, 1976) is a Canadian professional boxer and former professional ice hockey player. He played in the National Hockey League with the Nashville Predators, Toronto Maple Leafs, and Dallas Stars between 2001 and 2006. He currently works as a fire fighter at Bruce Power in Tiverton, Ontario.

Hockey career
Perrott was drafted by the New Jersey Devils in the second round of the 1995 NHL Entry Draft, with the 44th overall pick. Unsigned by New Jersey, he became a member of the Chicago Blackhawks for three and a half years before being traded to the Nashville Predators in 2001.

He made his NHL debut with Nashville during the 2001–02 NHL season, registering 3 points and 74 penalty minutes in 21 games. Perrott scored his first NHL goal on April 6, 2002 against the Calgary Flames Roman Turek. Perrott continued to play within the Nashville organization before being traded to the Toronto Maple Leafs in 2003 for Bob Wren. In the 2003–04 NHL season, Perrott was a long shot to crack the Maple Leafs roster but spent the entire season playing in Toronto, registering 3 points and 174 penalty minutes in 40 games.

At the beginning of the 2005–06 NHL season was traded to the Dallas Stars for a 6th round draft pick (used to select Leo Komarov, an eventual NHL All-Star).

Unable to find work with an NHL club, Perrott played parts of the 2008–09 season with Vityaz Chekhov of the Kontinental Hockey League.

Since his tour in Russia, Perrott came back to Ontario to play senior hockey with the Walkerton Capitals of the WOAA Senior AA Hockey League.

Boxing career
Known for his willingness to fight during games, it was reported September 5, 2009 that Perrott had retired from professional hockey to focus on a potential career in boxing. Perrott won his debut fight on September 11, 2009 when he defeated Makidi Ku Ntima via TKO in the fourth round.

Career statistics

Regular season and playoffs

Professional boxing record

|-
|align="center" colspan=8|1 Wins (1 knockouts, 0 decisions), 3 Losses, 0 Draws 
|-
| align="center" style="border-style: none none solid solid; background: #e3e3e3"|Result
| align="center" style="border-style: none none solid solid; background: #e3e3e3"|Record
| align="center" style="border-style: none none solid solid; background: #e3e3e3"|Opponent
| align="center" style="border-style: none none solid solid; background: #e3e3e3"|Type
| align="center" style="border-style: none none solid solid; background: #e3e3e3"|Round
| align="center" style="border-style: none none solid solid; background: #e3e3e3"|Date
| align="center" style="border-style: none none solid solid; background: #e3e3e3"|Location
| align="center" style="border-style: none none solid solid; background: #e3e3e3"|Notes
|-align=center
|align=left|
|-align=center
|Loss
|1–3
|align=left| Bradley Hamil
|TKO
|4 
|19/05/2017
|align=left| Hershey Centre, Mississauga, Ontario
|align=left|
|-align=center
|Loss
|1–2
|align=left| Artem Lipanov
|TKO
|1 
|30/06/2010
|align=left| Casino Rama, Rama, Ontario
|align=left|
|-align=center
|Loss
|1–1
|align=left| Jon Bolden
|TKO
|1 
|04/12/2009
|align=left| The Blue Horizon, Philadelphia, Pennsylvania
|align=left|
|-align=center
|Win
|1–0
|align=left| Makidi Ku Ntima
|TKO
|4 
|11/09/2009
|align=left| The Blue Horizon, Philadelphia, Pennsylvania
|align=left|
|-align=center

External links
 

1976 births
Living people
Albany River Rats players
Canadian ice hockey right wingers
Cleveland Lumberjacks players
Dallas Stars players
Canadian expatriate ice hockey players in Russia
HC Vityaz players
Ice hockey people from Ontario
Indianapolis Ice players
Ligue Nord-Américaine de Hockey players
Nashville Predators players
New Jersey Devils draft picks
Norfolk Admirals players
Oshawa Generals players
People from Wingham, Ontario
Sault Ste. Marie Greyhounds players
St. John's Maple Leafs players
Fort Worth Brahmas players
Toronto Maple Leafs players
Toronto Marlies players